Jonathan and Darlene's Greatest Hits: Volume 2 is a 1994 compilation album of songs by Paul Weston and Jo Stafford recorded in the guise of Jonathan and Darlene Edwards, a New Jersey lounge act who performed deliberately off-key, putting their own interpretation on popular songs. The album was released by Corinthian Records on February 22, 1994.

Track listing

 Cocktails for Two
 Tiptoe Through the Tulips
 Ain't Misbehavin'
 The Object of My Affections
 Five Foot Two, Eyes of Blue
 Sophisiticated Lady
 Play a Simple Melody
 I'm Beginning to See the Light
 For Me and My Gal
 La Vie En Rose
 Pretty Baby
 Paris in the Spring
 That Certain Party
 It's Magic

References

External links
A review

1994 greatest hits albums
Corinthian Records compilation albums
Comedy compilation albums
Jo Stafford compilation albums
Jonathan and Darlene Edwards albums
1990s comedy albums